Dieter Schneider may refer to:

 Dieter Schneider (fencer) (born 1959), German fencer
 Dieter Schneider (lyricist) (born 1937), German lyricist
 Dieter Schneider (footballer) (born 1949), German  football goalkeeper